The Rugby Africa Women's Cup is an international women's rugby union competition contested by women's national teams from Africa.

History 
Rugby Africa Women's Cup was initially launched in 2019. South Africa won the inaugural competition in Brakpan and also qualified for the 2021 Rugby World Cup in New Zealand. The 2020 tournament was cancelled due to the effects of the COVID-19 pandemic in Africa.

Summary

See also
Women's international rugby

References

External links
Rugby Africa Women's Cup - Rugby Africa official website

 

Women's rugby union competitions in Africa for national teams